Legislative elections were held in El Salvador on 1 March 2015, electing 84 members of the Legislative Assembly, 20 members of the Central American Parliament and 262 mayors.

Electoral system
The 84 members of the Legislative Assembly are elected by open list proportional representation from 14 multi-member constituencies based on the departments, with seats allocated using the largest remainder method.

Legislative election

Central American Parliament

Municipal

Departmental capitals

References

Legislative elections in El Salvador
Legislative election
El Salvador